The  is a Primary Reserve infantry regiment of the Canadian Army. It is part of the 2nd Canadian Division's 35 Canadian Brigade Group and is headquartered at Lévis, Quebec.

Insignia
The regimental insignia consists of two crossed Vickers machine guns, surmounted by a beaver supporting a fleur-de-lys. Under this is a scroll inscribed with the device  meaning 'Stronger than bronze', with a small maple leaf on each end.

Lineage
Le Régiment de la Chaudière perpetuates three units (1st Battalion, Select Embodied Militia, Dorchester Provincial Light Dragoons and the 1st Lotbinière Division) from the War of 1812 and as such carries Battle Honours which recognize the service of those previous units during the War of 1812 and, in particular, at the Battle of the Chateauguay.

The regiment itself originated in Saint-Anselme, Quebec, on 9 April 1869, as The Provisional Battalion of "Dorchester". It was redesignated as the 92nd "Dorchester" Battalion of Infantry on 12 June 1885. On 1 August 1899, it was amalgamated with the 23rd "Beauce" Battalion of Infantry but retained the same designation. It was redesignated as the 92nd Dorchester Regiment on 8 May 1900; as Le Régiment de Dorchester on 29 March 1920; as The Beauce Regiment on 15 March 1921; as Le Régiment de Beauce on 1 May 1921; and as Le Régiment de Dorchester et Beauce on 1 February 1932. On 15 December 1936, it amalgamated with the 5th Machine Gun Battalion, CMGC and was redesignated as Le Régiment de la Chaudière (Mitrailleuses). It was redesignated as the 2nd (Reserve) Battalion, Le Régiment de la Chaudière (Mitrailleuses) on 7 November 1940; as the 2nd (Reserve) Battalion, Le Régiment de la Chaudière on 1 April 1941; and as Le Régiment de la Chaudière on 24 April 1946. On 1 September 1954, it was amalgamated with Le Régiment de Lévis but retained the same designation.

The 23rd "Beauce" Battalion of Infantry originated in Sainte-Marie, Quebec, on 9 April 1869. On 1 August 1899, it was amalgamated with the 92nd Dorchester Battalion of Infantry.

Le Régiment de Lévis originated in Lévis, Quebec, on 1 December 1902, as the 17th Regiment of Infantry. It was redesignated as Le Régiment de Lévis on 29 March 1920; as the 2nd (Reserve) Battalion, Le Régiment de Lévis on 12 May 1942; and as Le Régiment de Lévis on 7 November 1945. On 1 September 1954, it amalgamated with Le Régiment de la Chaudière.

The 5th Machine Gun Battalion, CMGC originated in Quebec City, Quebec, on 1 June 1919, as the 5th Machine Gun Brigade, CMGC. It was redesignated as the 5th Machine Gun Battalion, CMGC on 15 September 1924. On 15 December 1936, it amalgamated with Le Régiment de Dorchester et Beauce.

Perpetuations

The War of 1812
 1st Battalion, Select Embodied Militia
 Dorchester Provincial Light Dragoons
 1st Lotbinière Division

Operational history

The Second World War
Le Régiment de la Chaudière (Mitrailleuses) mobilized Le Régiment de la Chaudière (Mitrailleuses), CASF on 1 September 1939. It was redesignated as Le Régiment de la Chaudière, CASF on 24 May 1940; and as the 1st Battalion, Le Régiment de la Chaudière, CASF on 7 November 1940. It embarked for Great Britain on 21 July 1941. On D-Day, 6 June 1944, it landed in Normandy, France as a part of the 8th Infantry Brigade, 3rd Canadian Infantry Division, and it continued to fight in North West Europe until the end of the war. The overseas battalion was disbanded on 15 January 1946.

War In Afghanistan
The regiment contributed an aggregate of more than 20% of its authorized strength to the various Task Forces which served in Afghanistan between 2002 and 2014.

History
The regiment mobilized a battalion for the Canadian Active Service Force in 1939. Initially organized as a machine gun battalion, the battalion was sent to England in August 1941. The unit was assigned to the 3rd Canadian Infantry Division as a standard rifle battalion and was designated as a reserve battalion during the D-Day landings in June 1944. Le Régiment de la Chaudière came ashore on the second wave at Bernières-sur-Mer after The Queen's Own Rifles of Canada, surprising the locals who hadn't expected to find francophone troops in the liberating forces. It was the only French-Canadian regiment to participate in Operation Overlord, and one of the few French-speaking units to come ashore that day alongside the bilingual The North Shore (New Brunswick) Regiment and the Free-French Commando Kieffer.

The regiment participated in the Battle for Caen, suffering several casualties in the fight at Carpiquet airfield on 4 July 1944.

With the rest of the division, the regiment fought in the Battle of the Scheldt, notably in actions in the Breskens Pocket between 6 October and 3 November 1944.

The unit wintered in the Nijmegen Salient and was again active in the Rhineland fighting in February 1945, and finished the war on German soil in May.

A 2nd Battalion served in the Reserve Army. A 3rd Battalion was raised for the Canadian Army Occupation Force.

Name
Citizens in Normandy were surprised to find that soldiers of the Chaudière spoke a type of French very close to that spoken in Normandy, but were puzzled by the regiment's name. In French,  is the word for a water heater or boiler. The regiment was named for the Chaudière River, itself named for the "boiling" of a waterfall on the river.

Battle honours
In the list below, battle honours in small capitals were awarded for participation in large operations and campaigns, while those in lowercase indicate honours granted for more specific battles. Those battle honours in bold type are emblazoned on the regimental colour.

Notable Members

Sergeant

Régiment de la Chaudière museum

The museum researches, collects, preserves and interprets as many artifacts as possible which illustrate the military life, particularly during the war in Europe, 1944–1945. The museum displays and describes arms, uniforms, equipment and customs of Le Régiment de la Chaudière from its founding and that of its antecedents.

Media
 Le Régiment de la Chaudière by Jacques & Armand Ross Castonguay (1983)
 Le Geste Du Régiment De La Chaudière by Major Armand, Major Michel Gauvin Ross and Georges Lepage (1945)

Order of precedence

Notable people
 Sergeant Léo Major

Notes

References

External links
 Web site of Le Régiment de la Chaudière
 Juno Beach - Le Régiment de la Chaudière on D-Day

Régiment de la Chaudière
Regimental museums in Canada
Museums in Quebec
Chaudiere, Regiment de la
Military units and formations of Quebec
Military units and formations of Canada in World War II
Infantry regiments of Canada in World War II
Military units and formations established in 1936
Armouries in Canada
Lévis, Quebec